Konya Airport  is a military air base and public airport  in Konya, Turkey. The airport is also used by NATO. Opened to the public in 2000, the airport is 18 km from the city. In 2006, Konya Airport served 2,924 aircraft and 262,561 passengers. The passenger terminal of the airport covers an area of 2,650 m2 and has parking for 278 cars.

Konya Airport is home to the 3rd Air Wing (Ana Jet Üssü or AJÜ) of the 1st Air Force Command (Hava Kuvvet Komutanlığı) of the Turkish Air Force (Türk Hava Kuvvetleri). Other wings of this command are located in Eskişehir (LTBI), Ankara Akıncı (LTAE), Bandırma (LTBG) and Balıkesir (LTBF).

Airlines and destinations

Traffic statistics 

(*)Source: DHMI.gov.tr

References

External links

 konyahavalimani.com The official Website

Airports in Turkey
Turkish Air Force bases
Buildings and structures in Konya Province
Transport in Konya Province
NATO installations in Turkey